Nosivka is a city in Nizhyn Raion, Chernihiv Oblast (province) of Ukraine. It hosts the administration of Nosivka urban hromada, one of the hromadas of Ukraine. Population: 

Until 18 July 2020, Nosivka was the administrative center of Nosivka Raion. The raion was abolished in July 2020 as part of the administrative reform of Ukraine, which reduced the number of raions of Chernihiv Oblast to five. The area of Nosivka Raion was merged into Nizhyn Raion.

Notable people
Roman Rudenko, Soviet lawyer, a chief prosecutor for the USSR at the Nuremberg trials.
Victoria Spartz, US representative from Indiana

Gallery

References

Cities in Chernihiv Oblast
Cities of district significance in Ukraine
Nezhinsky Uyezd